Guichón is a small city in the Paysandú Department of western Uruguay.

Geography

History
On 15 June 1907, it was declared "Pueblo" (village) by the Act of Ley Nº 3.203. Until then it had been the head of the judicial section "Palmar". On 22 June 1955, its status was elevated to "Villa" (town) by the Act of Ley Nº 12.199, and then on 17 November 1964, to "Ciudad" (city) by the Act of Ley Nº 13.299.

Population
In 2011 Guichón had a population of 5,039.
 
Source: Instituto Nacional de Estadística de Uruguay

Places of worship
 Mary Help of Christians Parish Church (Roman Catholic)

References

External links
INE map of Guichón
Eco tourism in Guichón, Viajando Por Uruguay

Populated places in the Paysandú Department